The 2006 Manly Warringah Sea Eagles season was the 60th in the club's history. Coached by Des Hasler and captained by Ben Kennedy, competed in the National Rugby League's 2006 Telstra Premiership. The Sea Eagles finished the regular season 5th (out of 15), reaching the finals where they were knocked out in the second week by the St. George Illawarra Dragons.

Season 2006, its 60th season in the competition, saw an average season in which the Manly side again advanced to the finals, finishing fifth. For this season only, a commemorative 60th anniversary logo was used on the player jerseys. Despite losing their first two matches of the season (both by small margins) the Sea Eagles built on their 2005 season to once again advance to the play-offs. Highlights in the season included wins over the Roosters in round 4, the Bulldogs in round 7, the Storm in round 11 and a last-minute win over the defending premiers Wests Tigers in round 14 in which Brett Stewart scored a spectacular try in the last five minutes.

In an away final against the Newcastle Knights, the Sea Eagles led at halftime only to see their lead run down in a controversial second half. Although they did advance a week further, the Sea Eagles' season ended with a 28–0 shutout at the hands of the St. George Illawarra Dragons. That match also marked Ben Kennedy's final game after two years in Manly colours.

At the 2006 Dally M Awards Manly's Ben Kennedy, who will retire at the end of the season, was named lock and captain of the year.

Ladder

References

Manly Warringah Sea Eagles seasons
Manly-Warringah Sea Eagles season